Kollur may refer to:

Places

Andhra Pradesh, India 
 Kollur, Guntur district, a village in Guntur district, Andhra Pradesh, India
 Kollur, Ranga Reddy, a village in Ranga Reddy district, Telangana, India

Telangana, India 
 Kolluru, Nalgonda district, Andhra Pradesh, India
 Kolluru, Srikakulam district, Andhra Pradesh, India
 Kollur, Guntur district, Andhra Pradesh, India

Karnataka, India 
 Kollur, Udupi district, a town in Udupi district, Karnataka, India
 Kollur, Bagalkot district, a village in Bilagi taluka, Bagalkot district, Karnataka, India
 Kollur, Chincholi taluka, a village in Chincholi taluka, Gulbarga district, Karnataka, India
 Kollur, Chitapur taluka, a village in Chitapur taluka, Gulbarga district, Karnataka, India
 Kollur, Gulbarga taluka, a village in Gulbarga taluka, Gulbarga district, Karnataka, India
 Kollur, Shahapur taluka, a village in Shahpur, Karnataka taluka, Yadgir district, Karnataka, India

Tehsils
 Kollur mandal, a tehsil in Guntur district, Andhra Pradesh, India

Other
 Kollur Mine, one of the world's most productive diamond mines